George Bricker (1898–1955) was an American screenwriter. He generally worked on second features at studios such as Warner Bros., Columbia, Universal and Monogram.

Selected filmography
 Broadway Hostess (1935)
 The Widow from Monte Carlo (1936)
 Love Is on the Air (1937)
 Melody for Two (1937)
 Sh! The Octopus (1937)
 Torchy Blane in Panama (1938)
 Over the Wall (1938)
 Torchy Blane in Chinatown (1939)
 Mr. Moto in Danger Island (1939)
 They Made Her a Spy (1939)
 Women in the Wind (1939)
 The Devil Bat (1940)
 The Blonde from Singapore (1941)
 Frisco Lil (1942)
 Little Tokyo, U.S.A. (1942)
 A Man's World (1942)
 Lure of the Islands (1942)
 The Dancing Masters (1943)
 House of Dracula (1945)
 Meet Me on Broadway (1946)
 House of Horrors (1946)
 She-Wolf of London (1946)
 The Corpse Came C.O.D. (1947)
 Beauty on Parade (1950)
 The Whip Hand (1951)
 Roadblock (1951)
 Man in the Dark (1953)
 Tangier Incident (1953)
 Loophole (1954)
 Cry Vengeance (1954)

References

Bibliography 
 Blottner, Gene. Columbia Pictures Movie Series, 1926-1955: The Harry Cohn Years. McFarland, 2011.

External links 
 

1898 births
1955 deaths
People from Ohio
20th-century American screenwriters